

People
Tawakoni tribe, a Native American tribe from Oklahoma and Texas

Places
East Tawakoni, Texas
Lake Tawakoni, Texas
Lake Tawakoni  State Park, in Wills Point, Texas
West Tawakoni, Texas, a reservoir east of Dallas

Other
USS Tawakoni  (ATF-114), a Fleet Ocean Tug in US Navy, 1944 to 1978